Bothampstead is a hamlet in the English county of Berkshire, and within the civil parish of Hampstead Norreys.
It consists of several houses and a farm. The word Bothampstead means - of 2 parts. Therefore, there is an upper and lower Bothampstead containing a few houses respectively.

Hamlets in Berkshire